Planaltinella bahia is a species of moth of the family Tortricidae. It is found in Bahia, Brazil.

The wingspan is about 22 mm for males and 27 mm for females. The forewings are creamy with some scattered pale brownish scales and concolorous subapical spots. The hindwings are white.

References

Moths described in 2002
Cochylini